Mike McCarthy is a former reporter in the north of England, who worked as a presenter for BBC Look North before becoming Sky News’ bureau chief in Manchester.  His team won an O2 journalism award in the North West.  He has covered many of the big stories in the North of England spanning from the Hillsborough disaster to the 2011 Manchester riots and the 2015 floods in Cumbria, Lancashire and York. He is a former winner of the BT Journalist of the Year award for the North East.

Cases covered include the shooting of Manchester police officers Fiona Bone and Nicola Hughes ,the disappearance of Welsh schoolgirl April Jones and the Manchester Arena bomb attack.
 
McCarthy has covered major international events in Afghanistan, Iraq, Israel and Washington DC.  He reported live during riots from the centre of Athens and on the Boston Marathon bombings in the US, and the storming of the Canadian parliament in Ottawa in 2014.

Educated in Derbyshire, Mike McCarthy studied journalism before working in commercial radio. Prior to joining Sky in 2000, he worked for the BBC in Leeds and London.

He occasionally lectures at universities.

Personal and family life
His son Ross took his own life in February 2021. Mike McCarthy drew attention to the pressures on people during the COVID-19 pandemic, and called for more mental health support for men.

References

External links

Year of birth missing (living people)
Living people
People from Derbyshire
British journalists
BBC newsreaders and journalists